Poophagus sisymbrii  is a species of weevil native to Europe. Nasturtium officinale is usual host plant. he "swims" quite well with his paws.

References

Curculionidae
Beetles described in 1777
Beetles of Europe